Kirk Cullimore Jr. is an American attorney and politician serving as a member of the Utah State Senate. Elected in 2018, Cullimore represented the 9th district until 2023. He currently represents the 19th district after being reelected in 2022.

Early life and education 
Cullimore was born and raised in Sandy, Utah. He earned an associate's degree from Utah Valley University, Bachelor of Arts from Brigham Young University, and Juris Doctor from the University of Oklahoma College of Law.

Career 
After graduating from law school, Cullimore began working as an attorney. He established a private legal practice in 2012. In 2018, Cullimore was elected to the Utah State Senate, succeeding Wayne L. Niederhauser. Cullimore was sworn in on January 1, 2019.

References 

Living people
Year of birth missing (living people)
Republican Party Utah state senators
Brigham Young University alumni
University of Oklahoma College of Law alumni
21st-century American politicians